Moosa Manik also known as Reeko Moosa Manik (Reeko is the name of his native home in Male)is a Maldivian former actor and politician know as hanburu. He also served as former deputy speaker of the Maldives Parliament, and former chairman of the Maldivian Democratic Party. He was a member of parliament Hulhu Henveiru constituency. Under the current regime of President Ibrahim Mohamed Solih, his daughter is posted in the Maldivian Embassy in UAE.

Private business, acting, and politics
Manik and his family own Heavy Load Private Limited, a company based in the Maldives which is primarily involved in island reclamation and harbor development works. under his chairmship in the company, Heavy Load Private Limited was awarded major government projects including a US$21 million (Rf269.8 million) reclamation project to reclaim 130 hectares from Thilafushi lagoon and Emboodhoo. Major projects awarded were forwarded to Maldives Anti corruption Commission, including Thilafushi reclamation project.

Moosa launched a campaign for the parliament in 2019 but later withdrew stating lack of interest. He was contesting for Laamu Atoll Constituency, which was the constituency he initiated his political career as special Majilis Member.

Filmography

Feature film

Television

Short film

Accolades

References

External links
Heavy Load website

Living people
Maldivian politicians
People from Malé
Maldivian male actors
Maldivian Democratic Party politicians
Date of birth missing (living people)
Year of birth missing (living people)